An act of faith is a prayer in which a person professes the beliefs of Christianity. In the Catholic Church, an individual is required to make an act of faith when they come to the age of accountability. An example of an act of faith is as follows:

See also 

Creed
Confirmation
Sinner's prayer, evangelical term referring to an act of conversion

References 

Salvation in Catholicism
Roman Catholic prayers